Histórias e Bicicletas (Reflexões, Encontros e Esperança) English: Histories and Bicycles (Reflections, Encounters and Hope)  is the eleven album by Oficina G3, released by MK Music in 2013. This is the second album with the new lead singer Mauro Henrique and the one with Alexandre Aposan.

Track listing
 "Diz" – 5:42
 "Água Viva" – 6:20
 "Encontro" – 6:21
 "Confiar" – 5:13
 "Não Ser" – 5:52
 "Compartilhar" – 4:59
 "Descanso" – 5:18
 "Aos Pés da Cruz" – 4:01
 "Sou Eu" – 5:41
 "Lágrimas" – 7:17
 "Save Me From Yourself" – 4:16

Personnel
 Mauro Henrique: vocals, guitar
 Juninho Afram: electric guitar, vocals
 Duca Tambasco: bass
 Jean Carllos: keyboard, piano, vocals
 Alexandre Aposan: drums

Additional personnel
Leonardo Gonçalves: vocals in "Lágrimas"
Richard Woodcraft: mixing

Certifications

References

2013 albums
Oficina G3 albums